Pinkflower hedgehog cactus is a common name for several cacti and may refer to:

Echinocereus bonkerae
Echinocereus fasciculatus
Echinocereus fendleri